Joseph Zoderer (25 November 1935 – 1 June 2022) was an Italian writer from South Tyrol who wrote in German.

Personal life and death
Zodrer was born on 25 November 1935 in Merano, Italy.

He was an Italian writer and businessman.

He died on 1 June 2022 in Bruneck, Italy at the age of 86.

References

1935 births
2022 deaths
Italian writers
People from Merano
Germanophone Italian people
Recipients of the Austrian Cross of Honour for Science and Art